Sylwia Lisewska (born 31 May 1986) is a Polish handballer for Măgura Cisnădie and the Polish national team.

International honours   
Carpathian Trophy:
Winner: 2017

Individual awards 
 Ekstraklasa Top Scorer: 2017, 2018

References

1986 births
Living people
People from Suwałki
Polish female handball players
Expatriate handball players
Polish expatriate sportspeople in Romania
CS Minaur Baia Mare (women's handball) players
21st-century Polish women